Navinagar is a city cum Nagar Panchayat in Aurangabad district in the Indian state of Bihar, and is the location of Nabinagar Super Thermal Power Project.

Geography
Its average elevation is 138 metres (452 feet).

Overview 

It has also been the assembly constituency of nationalist and first Bihar Deputy Chief Minister cum Finance Minister, Bihar Vibhuti Anugrah Narayan Sinha.

Nabinagar is slated to become a power hub since Bihar Government and NTPC are collaborating to set up a coal based thermal power plant, having three units of 660 MW each.

Demographics

 India census, Nabinagar had a population of 19,041. Males constitute 51% of the population and females 49%. Nabinagar has an average literacy rate of 73%: male literacy is 70%, and female literacy is 63%. In Nabinagar, 18% of the population is under 6 years of age.

References

Cities and towns in Aurangabad district, Bihar